The Race was a round-the-world sailing race that started in Barcelona, Spain, on December 31, 2000.

The race was created by Bruno Peyron, and it was the first ever non-stop, no-rules, no-limits, round-the-world sailing event, with a $2 million US prize.

The stated objectives of this race were:
 to unite the different maritime cultures of the world
 to gather together the world's premiere yachtsmen and women in a common event
 to promote creativity in ocean sailing
 to ally high technology and the environment
 to create the most spectacular and most prestigious fleet of offshore racers that sailing has ever seen

A second race was planned for 2004, but was cancelled amid controversy that Tracy Edwards had organised a competing event called Oryx Quest.

Results 
The 2000–01 race was won by Club Med, skippered by Grant Dalton in 62d 6h 56' 33".

See also
 Jules Verne Trophy

References

External links
 The Race coverage at cat-alist

2000 in sailing
Round-the-world sailing competitions
Yachting races